The 1973 Fenland District Council election took place on 7 June 1973 to elect members for Fenland District Council in the Isle of Ely, Cambridgeshire, England. The Conservative Party became the largest bloc on the new council, with half the seats.

1973 Fenland District Council elections

Summary 
At the first meeting of the council, Edward Morris (Independent) was elected chairman.

Ward results 
For 1 April 1974 (first election 7 June 1973) to 6 May 1976:

Benwick and Doddington

Chatteris

Elm

Leverington

Manea

March Eastern

March Western

Newton and Tydd St Giles

Outwell and Upwell

Parson Drove and Wisbech St Mary

Whittlesey Ponnders Bridge and Kingsmoor

Whittlesey East Central

Whittlesey West Central

Whittlesey Coates

Wimblington

Wisbech East

Whittlesey Central

Whittlesey South

Whittlesey West

Wisbech North

Wisbech South and West

References

Fenland District Council elections
Fenland